Group calling, similar to conference call, is a means of communication where the calling party wishes to involve multiple parties. In comparison to conference calling, all parties involved in a call always have the opportunity to participate actively. Alternatively, group calling also functions as a means of leaving voice message to defined groups. The calling initiator calls a number that identifies the caller and inquires the caller as to which of the caller’s defined groups the voice message should be sent to. Many US-based group calls now take place using free conference calling services.

Usage 

Group calling offers, as an implication of its functionality, alternative opportunities and new settings for group communication. The concept of group-calling, moves conference calling to a more social and flexible means of interaction.

Events
When preparing for an event, such as a party, reunion, or meeting, all of those involved are called at any one time to spread the necessary information or come to an agreement and make decisions together.

Educational purposes
A significant amount of coursework is completed in groups. A common problem is having the time and place to assemble the entire group for the purpose of working together. With the concept of group calling, group members need not be together at all times for group work. Agreements upon complicated decisions related to the direction of the assignment are made in a group-call, with all active group members taking part in the conversation actively.

Social groups, clubs and teams
Communication in groups is often utilized for the purpose of spreading an important message or agreeing upon decisions that need to be made together. The group-calling concept is applied to groups with the need to involve all or most members at a specific point in time.

Prayer groups and support groups
Group calling is an alternative to getting together in cases where the need for communication is sudden or more frequent. This calling method is commonly used for groups that wish to communicate together spontaneously, or on a daily basis without having to meet personally, as it is a quick and mobile alternative.

Small businesses
Similar to conference calling, group calling is used in business situations where decisions must be made and the necessary people are not all in one place due to either geographical dispersion or flexible work hours.

See also

References

Calling features